The Volkswagen air-cooled engine is an air-cooled, gasoline-fuelled, boxer engine with four horizontally opposed cast-iron cylinders, cast aluminum alloy cylinder heads and pistons, magnesium-alloy crankcase, and forged steel crankshaft and connecting rods.

There are two distinct families/variations of the aircooled engine namely Type 1 and Type 4. The Type 3 engine is a variation of the Type 1 engine with pancake cooling arrangement.

Variations of the engine were produced by Volkswagen plants worldwide from 1936 until 2006 for use in Volkswagen's own vehicles, notably the Type 1 (Beetle), Type 2 (bus, transporter), Type 3, and Type 4.  Additionally, the engines were widely used in industrial, light aircraft and kit car applications.

Type 1: 1.0–1.6 litres

1200

For other applications, the power and torque output may vary, e.g.

Other applications
Beginning in 1987, Dunn-Right Incorporated of Anderson, South Carolina has made a kit to perform the conversion of a VW engine to a compressor.

Industrial
Volkswagen AG has officially offered these air-cooled boxer engines for use in industrial applications since 1950, lately under its Volkswagen Industrial Motor brand.

Aircraft

The air-cooled opposed four-cylinder Beetle engines have been used for other purposes as well. Limbach Flugmotoren has since 1970 produced more than 6000 certified aircraft engines based on the Beetle engine. Sauer has since 1987 produced certified engines for small airplanes and motorgliders, and is now also producing engines for the ultralight community in Europe.

Especially interesting is its use as an experimental aircraft engine. This type of VW engine deployment started separately in Europe and in the US. In Europe this started in France straight after the Second World War using the engine in the Volkswagen Kübelwagen that were abandoned by the thousands in the country side and peaked with the JPX engine. In the US this started in the 1960s when VW Beetle started to show up there. A number of companies still produce aero engines that are Volkswagen Beetle engine derivatives: Limbach, Sauer, Hapi, Revmaster, Great Plains Type 1 Front Drive, Hummel, the AeroConversions AeroVee Engine, and others. Kit planes or plans built experimental aircraft were specifically designed to utilize these engines. The VW air-cooled engine does not require an expensive and often complex gear reduction unit to utilize a propeller at efficient cruise RPM. With its relative low cost and parts availability, many experimental aircraft are designed around the VW engines.

Formula V Air Racing uses aircraft designed to get maximum performance out of a VW powered aircraft resulting in race speeds above 160 mph.

Some aircraft that use the VW engine are:

Half VW

For aircraft use, a number of experimenters, who were seeking a small, two-cylinder, four-stroke engine, began cutting Type 1 VW engine blocks in half, creating a two-cylinder, horizontally opposed engine. The resulting engine produces . Plans and kits have been made available for these conversions.

One such conversion is the Carr Twin, designed by Dave Carr, introduced in January 1975, in the Experimental Aircraft Association's Sport Aviation magazine. The design won the John Livingston Award for its outstanding contribution to low cost flying and also was awarded the Stan Dzik Memorial Award for outstanding design.

Other examples include the Total Engine Concepts MM CB-40 and Better Half VW.

Some aircraft that use the Half VW engine are:

References

Air cooled
Boxer engines
Lists of automobile engines
1930s aircraft piston engines